White Reaper Does It Again is the debut studio album by the band White Reaper.

Track listing

References

2015 debut albums
White Reaper albums
Polyvinyl Record Co. albums